

Hermann Cäsar Hannibal Schubert (22 May 1848 – 20 July 1911) was a German mathematician.

Schubert was one of the leading developers of enumerative geometry, which considers those parts of algebraic geometry that involve a finite number of solutions. In 1874, Schubert won a prize for solving a question posed by Zeuthen. Schubert calculus was named after him.

Schubert tutored Adolf Hurwitz at the Realgymnasium Andreanum in Hildesheim, Hanover, and arranged for Hurwitz to study under Felix Klein at University.

See also
 Schubert cycle or Schubert variety
 Schubert polynomial

Publications

References

Werner Burau and Bodo Renschuch, "Ergänzungen zur Biographie von Hermann Schubert," (Complements to the biography of Hermann Schubert,) Mitt. Math. Ges. Hamb. 13, pp. 63–65 (1993), ISSN 0340-4358.

External links
 
 
 
 

1848 births
1911 deaths
19th-century German mathematicians
20th-century German mathematicians
Algebraic geometers